Sanjay Mone (Marathi: संजय मोने) is a veteran Marathi actor, dialogue writer and script writer. He has also written many plays and regularly writes in the newspaper. He worked in a number of TV serials, plays and films.

TV serials
 Ambat Goad
 Khulta Kali Khulena
 Maziya Priyala Preet Kalena
 Avaghachi Sansar
 Abhalmaya
 Kanala Khada
 De Dhamaal

Filmography 
 Dhyasparva ध्यासपर्व (2001)
 Pak Pak Pakaak पक पक पकाक (2005)
 Kaydyacha Bola कायद्याचं बोला (2005)
 Matichya Chuli मातीच्या चुली (2006)
 Sade Made Teen साडे माडे तीन (2006)
 It's Breaking News इट्स ब्रेकिंग न्यूज (2007)
 Rakta Charitra रक्त चरित्र (2010) 
 Sanshay Kallol संशय कल्लोळ (2013) 
 A Paying Ghost अ पेईंग घोस्ट (2015)
 Time Bara Vait टाइम बरा वाईट (2015)
 Classmates क्लासमेट्स (2015)
 Mumbai Time मुंबई टाइम (2016)
 Barayan बारायण (2018)
 Dhagedore धागेदोरे
 Kshitij: A Horizon क्षितिज : अ होरायझन
 LBW (Life Before Marriage) लाईफ बिफोर मॅरेज
 Ringa Ringa रिंगा रिंगा
 Ashach Eka Betavar अशाच एका बेटावर
 A Rainy Day अ रेनी डे
 Investment इन्व्हेस्टमेंट (2012)
 Sanshay Kallol संशय कल्लोळ
 The Strugglers – Aamhi Udyache Hero द स्ट्रगलर - आम्ही उद्याचे हिरो
 Satya सत्या
 Mhais म्हैस
 Savitri ani Satyawan सावित्री आणि सत्यवान
 Bho Bho भो भो
 Shur Aamhi Sardar शूर आम्ही सरदार
 Godavari (2021)

Dialogue writing
 Savitiri ani Satyavan सावित्री आणि सत्यवान (2012)
 Sanshay Kallol संशय कल्लोळ (2013)
 Sade Made Teen साडे माडे तीन
 It's Breaking News इट्स ब्रेकिंग न्यूज (2007) 
 Pak Pak Pakak पक पक पकाक (2005)

Plays 
 Jhing Chik Jhing (2009)
 Mhais (2013)
 A Rainy Day (2014)
 1234 (2016)
 Bus Stop (2017)
 9 Koti 57 Lakh (2017)
 Barayan (2018)

Awards 
 Zee TV Award for the play 9 Koti 5.7 million

Personal life
Sanjay Mone is married to actress Sukanya Kulkarni. They are blessed with daughter Julia.

References

Indian male film actors
Indian male television actors
Living people
Male actors from Mumbai
21st-century Indian male actors
Marathi actors
Male actors in Marathi cinema
Male actors in Hindi cinema
1965 births
Marathi-language writers
Male actors in Marathi television